Captain Thomas J. Box (November 7, 1833 – December 18, 1914) was an American soldier who fought in the American Civil War. Box received the country's highest award for bravery during combat, the Medal of Honor, for his action during the Battle of Resaca in Georgia on 14 May 1864. He was honored with the award on 7 April 1865.

Biography
Box was born on 7 November 1833 in Indiana. He enlisted into the 27th Indiana Infantry at Bedford, Indiana. He died on 18 December 1914 in Indianapolis and his remains are interred at the Green Hill Cemetery in Indiana.

Medal of Honor citation

See also

List of American Civil War Medal of Honor recipients: A–F

References

1833 births
1914 deaths
People of Indiana in the American Civil War
Union Army officers
United States Army Medal of Honor recipients
American Civil War recipients of the Medal of Honor